Scalenomyces is a genus of fungi in the family Laboulbeniaceae. A monotypic genus, it contains the single species Scalenomyces endogaeus.

References

External links
Scalenomyces at Index Fungorum

Laboulbeniomycetes
Monotypic Laboulbeniomycetes genera